Kahn Qaleh (also Romanized as Kahn Qal‘eh and Kohan Qal‘eh) is a village in Chahar Gonbad Rural District, in the Central District of Sirjan County, Kerman Province, Iran. At the 2006 census, its population was 16, in 5 families.

References 

Populated places in Sirjan County